Harry German Castillo Vallejo, (born 14 May 1974) is a Colombian football forward who played for many South Korean football clubs.

Honours

Club

Individual

Stats in K League 

During his time in Busan, he played in the All-Star Game on the recommendation of a coach

International goals

References

External links

1974 births
Living people
Association football midfielders
Colombian footballers
Millonarios F.C. players
Suwon Samsung Bluewings players
Busan IPark players
Seongnam FC players
Gyeongnam FC players
Deportivo Pasto footballers
Bogotá FC footballers
Colombian expatriate footballers
Expatriate footballers in South Korea
K League 1 players